List of German film lists from the 1950s. From 1949 Germany was divided into East and West Germany. Both had separate film industries.

1950

1951

1952

1953

1954

1955

1956

1957

1958

1959

1950s
 
Germany
Films